Mpanda is a town in the Commune of Mpanda in Bubanza Province in northwestern Burundi.

It is the seat of the Commune of Mpanda.

References

External links
Satellite map at Maplandia.com

Populated places in Burundi
Bubanza Province